Year 136 (CXXXVI) was a leap year starting on Saturday (link will display the full calendar) of the Julian calendar, the 136th Year of the Common Era (CE) and Anno Domini (AD) designations, the 136th year of the 1st millennium, the 36th year of the 2nd century, and the 7th year of the 130s decade. At the time, it was known as the Year of the Consulship of Commodus and Civica (or, less frequently, year 889 Ab urbe condita). The denomination 136 for this year has been used since the early medieval period, when the Anno Domini calendar era became the prevalent method in Europe for naming years.

Events

By place

Roman Empire 
 The war against the Suebi begins (they will be defeated by Tiberius Haterius Nepos Atinas, Roman governor of Pannonia, in 138). 
 Emperor Hadrian chases the Jews from Galilee, and receives a triumphal arch near Scythopolis. 
 The Roman province of Iudaea (plus Galilee) becomes Syria Palaestina, the name Palestine as a designation for this land was used since at least the 5th century BC (mentioned by Herodotus).
 Hadrian dictates his memoirs at his villa near Tivoli (Tibur) outside Rome. 
 Hadrian uncovers a new conspiracy among certain senators. He adopts Lucius Aelius as his heir.

Asia 
 First year of Yonghe era of the Chinese Han Dynasty.

By topic

Religion 
 Pope Hyginus succeeds Pope Telesphorus as the ninth pope of Rome according to tradition.
 Change of Bishop of Byzantium from Bishop Eleutherius to Bishop Felix.

Births

Deaths 
 May 24 – Judah ben Dama, one of the Ten Martyrs
 Gajabahu I, king of Raja Rata (modern Sri Lanka)
 Lucius Julius Servianus, Roman politician (b. AD 45)
 Rabbi Akiva, Jewish scholar and sage (b. AD 50)

References